The Pocumtuc (also Pocomtuck or Deerfield Indians) were a Native American tribe historically inhabiting western areas of Massachusetts.

Settlements 
Their territory was concentrated around the confluence of the Deerfield and Connecticut Rivers in today's Franklin County. Their homelands also included much of current-day Hampden and Hampshire Counties, plus areas now in northern Connecticut and southern Vermont. 

Their principal village, also known as Pocumtuck, was in the vicinity of the present day village of Deerfield.

Language 
Their language, now extinct, was an R-dialect of the Algonquian language family, most likely related to the Wappinger and nearby Mahican tribes of the Hudson River Valley.

Subsistence 
The Pocumtuc people likely led lifestyles similar to neighboring tribes in New England. They would have engaged in semi-sedentary agriculture of maize, beans, and squash. They also hunted game and fished in the Connecticut River, which served as a major inland transportation route.  

Archaeological and documentary evidence both testify to the fact that the Pocumtuc were skilled at maize horticulture. The fertile open meadows around present-day Deerfield were cleared and planted with corn, and dozens of short-term food storage pits pocked the surface of the glacial outcropping called Pine Hill.

History 

The Pocumtuck were decimated by smallpox epidemics after European contact.  They had no immunity to the new disease and suffered high fatalities. In addition, they lost tribal members due to taking part in wars among the Dutch, English, French, and their respective Native American allies.

The Pocumtuck were originally allied with the Tunxis and Narragansett against Chief Uncas of the Mohegan and the Pequot.  All these tribes united against the English colonists with the Wampanoag Confederacy in King Philip's War.

At the close of the war, many Pocumtuck, Nipmuc, and other tribes fled to Schaghticoke, a village on the Hudson River.  They remained there until the outbreak of the Seven Years' War in 1754, when most joined and merged into the Abenaki tribes at Saint-François-du-Lac, Quebec or moved further west. Small bands remained in Massachusetts as late as the 19th century, but most fled north or lost their tribal identity through intermarriage with other tribes and settlers. Many of the present-day Abenaki of New Hampshire, Vermont, and Canada are of part-Pocumtuck ancestry.

Among the members of the Pocumtuck tribe was Chief Wawanotewat (1670–ca. 1750), better known as Gray Lock. A famous warrior, he led Abenaki bands into Massachusetts after most of his followers had left the state. There is a tradition that states that Mount Greylock in the Berkshires is named for him, (or that it was named for the grey clouds that surround the peak during the winter).

Villages associated with the Pocumtuck
 Agawam - present-day Metro Center Springfield, Massachusetts. The adjacent, present-day city of Agawam, Massachusetts is named after this village (sometimes associated with the Nipmuc)
 Mayawaug - present-day West Suffield, Connecticut
 Nameroke - present-day Enfield, Connecticut
 Nonotuck - present-day Northampton, Massachusetts / Easthampton, Massachusetts
 Norwottuck - present-day Hadley, Massachusetts
 Pachasock - present-day Westfield, Massachusetts / West Springfield, Massachusetts
 Peskeompscut - present-day Turners Falls, Massachusetts
 Pocumtuck - present-day Deerfield, Massachusetts
 Scitico - present-day Enfield, Connecticut (farther east)
 Squakeag - present-day Northfield, Massachusetts (primary town of the Sokoki)
 Woronoco or Waranoak - present-day Russell, Massachusetts or colonial Westfield, Massachusetts

In popular culture
The Pocumtucks are mentioned in the H. P. Lovecraft novella The Dunwich Horror as the presumed builders of the stone circles in the hills around Dunwich.

See also 
 Native American tribes in Massachusetts

References

External links 
Pocomtuc History

Algonquian ethnonyms
Algonquian peoples
Indigenous peoples of the Northeastern Woodlands
Extinct languages of North America
Extinct Native American tribes
Native American tribes in Connecticut
Native American tribes in Massachusetts
Native American history of Massachusetts